Abraham P. Bos (born 1943, Baarn) is a retired professor in Ancient and Patristic philosophy at the Vrije Universiteit, Amsterdam, specializing in the philosophy of Aristotle

His doctoral thesis in 1971   was "Een onderzoek naar de kosmologie van Aristoteles in de eerste jaren van zijn wijsgerige activiteit" (A study of the cosmology of Aristotle in the first years of his philosophical activity)  His inaugural lecture in 1976 was "Providentia Divina: The Theme of Divine Pronoia in Plato and Aristotle"

He is the author, co author, or co-editor of

Bos, Abraham P, and Rein Ferwerda. Aristotle, on the Life-Bearing Spirit (de Spiritu): A Discussion with Plato and His Predecessors on Pneuma As the Instrumental Body of the Soul: Introduction, Translation, and Commentary. Leiden : Brill, 2008. , a book found in 416 libraries according to WorldCat
Bos, Abraham P. The Soul and Its Instrumental Body: A Reinterpretation of Aristotle's Philosophy of Living Nature. Leiden, Netherlands: Brill, 2003. 
Bos, Abraham P. Cosmic and Meta-Cosmic Theology in Aristotle's Lost Dialogues. Leiden u.a: Brill, 1989 
Translated into Italian as Teologia cosmica e metacosmica : per una nuova interpretazione dei dialoghi perduti di Aristotele 
Bos, Abraham P, and J N. Kraay. On the Elements: Aristotle's Early Cosmology. Assen: Van Gorcum, 1973.  (based on his doctoral thesis)

References 

1943 births
Living people
20th-century Dutch philosophers
Vrije Universiteit Amsterdam alumni
Academic staff of Vrije Universiteit Amsterdam
People from Baarn